Lutkun is a village in Akhtynsky District of Dagestan. It is one of the most ancient and large settlements in the Samur valley, the second largest in Akhtynsky area.

History	
The ancient history of the village, not preserved, the first fortress village was founded in the 2nd century AD on the hill, in the old, historical part of the village. In the old village, surrounded by a high stone wall with two gates in the 12th-century madrasah was built, and even earlier, in the 10th-century mosque. On 9 August 2008, there was a solemn celebration of the 2000th anniversary of Lutkun.

Population
In 2010, there were 3200 people. In 2002, there were 3059 people, (746 families-households). People village are lezgins nationality and Muslim-Sunni religion.

Sport
In 2011 FC Samur won the Cup in South Daghestan football.

References

Rural localities in Akhtynsky District